The 1998–99 FA Cup (known as The AXA sponsored FA Cup for sponsorship reasons) was the 118th season of the FA Cup. It was won by Manchester United, who beat Newcastle United 2–0 in the final at the old Wembley Stadium. The goals were scored by Teddy Sheringham after 11 minutes, less than two minutes after coming on as a substitute for Roy Keane, and Paul Scholes on 53 minutes. It was the second leg of a historic treble for Manchester United; having already won the Premier League title the previous weekend, they went on to win the Champions League the following Wednesday.

Calendar

First round proper

The first round featured those non-league teams who had come through the qualifying rounds and the teams from the third and fourth tiers of the English football league system. The matches were played on 14 November 1998. There were ten replays, with three ties requiring a penalty shoot-out to settle.

Second round proper
The second round of the competition featured the winners of the first round ties. The matches were scheduled to be played on 5 December 1998, with eight replays and two penalty shoot-outs required, each of which featured a team who won on penalties in the previous round.

Third round proper
The third round of the season's FA Cup was scheduled for 2 January 1999. This round marked the point at which the teams in the two highest divisions in the English league system, the Premier League and the Football League First Division (now known as the Football League Championship). There were six replays, with none of these games requiring a penalty shoot-out.

Fourth round proper
The fourth-round ties were played with the thirty-two winners of the previous round. The matches were originally scheduled for 23 January 1999. There were three replays.

Fifth round proper
The fifth-round matches were scheduled for 13 February 1999. There were three replays, and one game replayed, Arsenal had beaten Sheffield United in the original tie. However, both sides felt that Arsenal's winning goal had been gained unfairly. Arsenal's boss Arsene Wenger wrote himself into FA Cup folklore with an act of sportsmanship that saw him offer to play the game again after Marc Overmars scored following Nwankwo Kanu's failure to return the ball to the Blades following an injury.

Sixth round proper
The four quarter-final games were scheduled for 6 March 1999, although only the match between Arsenal and Derby County was played on this date. One of the ties, Manchester United–Chelsea, resulted in a draw and went to a replay, which United won.

Barnsley, who lost 1–0 at home to Tottenham Hotspur, were the last team left in the competition from outside the Premier League.

Replay

Semi-finals
The semi-finals were played on 11 April 1999. The original match between Manchester United and Arsenal finished as a goalless draw, as Roy Keane's goal for Manchester United was ruled out for offside, and the tie went to a replay; it was to be the last replay of a drawn semi-final, with all future ties decided by extra time and penalties.

In the replay, David Beckham opened the scoring for Manchester United in the 17th minute with a strike from 30 yards. Dennis Bergkamp equalised via a deflected shot from the same distance midway through the second half, before Arsenal had a second goal disallowed for offside against Nicolas Anelka. In the immediate aftermath, Keane was sent off for a foul on Overmars that earned him a second yellow card. In the final minutes of normal time, Phil Neville conceded a penalty with a foul on Ray Parlour, only for Manchester United goalkeeper Peter Schmeichel to correctly guess which way Bergkamp would shoot and save the kick. In extra time, Ryan Giggs intercepted a wayward pass from Patrick Viera just inside the Manchester United half, before dribbling past Vieira, Lee Dixon (twice), Martin Keown and Tony Adams, and beating Arsenal goalkeeper David Seaman with a left-footed strike into the roof of the net. It was hailed almost immediately as one of the greatest goals ever scored in the history of the competition.

The other semi-final between Newcastle and Tottenham was goalless after 90 minutes, but two extra-time goals from Newcastle's Alan Shearer (one from the penalty spot) put the Magpies into their second consecutive FA Cup final and ended Spurs' hopes of adding to the League Cup title they had earned earlier in the season.

Replay

Final

The final took place on 22 May 1999 and was played at the old Wembley Stadium, between Manchester United and Newcastle United.  Manchester United had finished as champions and Newcastle 13th in the Premier League that season. The final was a slightly one-sided affair, Manchester United claiming a record 10th success with a 2–0 win. Goals from Teddy Sheringham and Paul Scholes were scored in the 11th and 53rd minutes respectively. It was the buildup to Manchester United's Treble. Manchester United also became the first team to win the double three times.

Media coverage
In the United Kingdom, ITV were the free-to-air broadcasters for the second consecutive season, while Sky Sports were the subscription broadcasters for the 11th consecutive season.

The matches shown live on ITV Sport were: Port Vale v Liverpool (R3); Wolverhampton Wanderers v Arsenal (R4); Manchester United v Fulham (R5); Newcastle United v Everton (QF); Newcastle United v Tottenham Hotspur (SF); and Manchester United 2–0 Newcastle United (Final).

References

External links

FA Cup Results at The FA Official site

 
1998
1998–99 in English football
1998–99 domestic association football cups